Christopher Patrick Chung, is an Australian actor and singer of Chinese and Irish descent, best known for playing Roddy Ho for Apple TV+ in Slow Horses. He grew up in Australia, studied in New York and now works in London.

List of credits

Commercials

Television

Film

Theatre

References

External links
 
 Christopher Chung agency profile at New Faces Talent
 

Living people
British male film actors
British male stage actors
British male television actors
British male actors of Chinese descent
1988 births
21st-century British singers
21st-century British male singers